Stefan Deloose (born 14 January 1990) is a Belgian footballer who plays as a goalkeeper for Bornem in the Belgian Third Division.

References

External links

1990 births
Living people
Association football goalkeepers
K.S.C. Lokeren Oost-Vlaanderen players
Beerschot A.C. players
Belgian Pro League players
People from Bornem
Belgian footballers
Footballers from Antwerp Province